Bharathi Kannamma is a 2014 Indian Tamil-language soap opera that aired on Vendhar TV from 1 June 2014 to 3 July 2015 on Monday through Friday at 07:30PM IST for 219 episodes.

The show stars remona,  Mithira Sri, Selvaraj, Sai Latha, Mohana, Birla boss and Ilavarasan. The show directed by Nimesh, S.Senthil Kumaran B.E and S.Bala. It was also aired in Malaysia Tamil Channel on Astro Vaanavil.

Plot
Barathi Kanamma is a story about two girls who hate each other from their childhood, but later become best friends.

Cast
 Mithrasri
 Selvaraj
 Vidhya boss
 Sai Latha
 Rithiya
 Gowthami
Brila Bose
 Ilavarasan
 Mohana as Karpagam (Bharathi's mother)
 Ramakirushnan
 Annamalai
 Sobhana
 Kandukondain kandukondain fame Madhu Mohan as Maaran

International broadcast
  In Malaysia Tamil Channel on Astro Vaanavil. It aired Monday through Friday at 11:00AM and 4:30PM.

References

Check Latest updates Bharathi Kannamma (TV series) with www.pakka.tv

External links
 Vendhar TV Website 
 Vendhar TV on YouTube

Vendhar TV television series
Tamil-language children's television series
2014 Tamil-language television series debuts
2010s Tamil-language television series
Tamil-language television shows
2015 Tamil-language television series endings